Hani Al-Dhabit Faraj Bait Al-Noobi (born 15 October 1979), commonly known as Hani Al-Dhabit, is an Omani footballer who plays as a midfielder for Dhofar S.C.S.C. in Oman Professional League.

Club career
Hani Al-Dhabit is a long-time veteran of the most successful sports club in Oman, Dhofar S.C.S.C. and has been in the squad for over 10 years. He is the captain of Dhofar and wears the number 14 jersey, as he had previously worn throughout his career with the national team.

He has also played for various clubs in GCC; for example Baniyas SC of the United Arab Emirates, Al Sadd SC of Qatar, and Al Jahra SC of Kuwait.

International career

He played for the Oman national football team from 1998 to 2008 and was the captain of the team in 2002 and 2003. His most successful season for the national team was during 2001–02, and he was the world's leading goalscorer in international matches in 2001.

Arabian Gulf Cup
Hani has made appearances in the 14th Arabian Gulf Cup, the 15th Arabian Gulf Cup, the 16th Arabian Gulf Cup and the 17th Arabian Gulf Cup.

In the 14th Arabian Gulf Cup in 1998, despite his young age, he scored a goal in a 2–2 draw against Bahrain. In the tournament, Oman finished at the fourth place with four points from one win and one draw.

He first showed his talent during the 15th Arabian Gulf Cup in 2002 scoring five goals, a hat-trick in a 3–1 win over the powerhouse 9-time competition winners, a goal in a 1–2 loss against Qatar and another in a 1–1 draw against Bahrain. At the end of the competition, he was awarded the "Top Goal Scorer" award. In the tournament, Oman finished at the fifth place with four points from one win and one draw.

Although not being successful in scoring any goals in both the 16th Arabian Gulf Cup and the 17th Arabian Gulf Cup, he still made many appearances and was handed the captain's band once again in the 16th Arabian Gulf Cup in 2003–04. This time Hani led Oman to its most successful position ever yet in the Arabian Gulf Cup competition, reaching the final four round for the first time with eight points from two wins and two draws.

During the 17th Arabian Gulf Cup in 2004, he was not assigned captaincy by Czech coach Milan Macala. He was featured widely as a substitute, but still received an adequate amount of playing time, and scored a goal in the penalty-kick shootout during the final in which Oman lost to the hosts Qatar in a penalty shootout after the goalkeeping sensation Ali Al-Habsi missed a penalty. Qatar won the match 6–5 on penalties after the match had ended 1–1 at the normal time. Amad Al-Hosni was awarded the "Top Goal Scorer" award of the competition with a total of four goals.

AFC Asian Cup qualification
He scored five goals in the qualification for the 2004 AFC Asian Cup, one in a 7–0 win over Nepal, a brace in a 6–0 win over Vietnam, other in a 3–1 win over South Korea and another in a 2–0 win over Vietnam hence helping his team to qualify for the 2004 AFC Asian Cup. In the tournament, Oman won four points in a 2–0 win over Thailand and a 2–2 draw against Iran and hence failed to qualify for the quarter-finals.

FIFA World Cup qualification
He has made fourteen appearances in 2002 FIFA World Cup qualification and has represented the national team in 2010 FIFA World Cup qualification.

He scored eleven goals in 2002 FIFA World Cup qualification, five goals in a 12–0 win over Laos, a brace in the return leg in a 7–0 win over Laos, a brace in a 7–0 win over Philippines and another in a 2–2 draw against the United Arab Emirates. During the qualifications, Oman had scored some of the most goals in the shortest period of time, with the largest margin wins in the team's history. Many of the goals were scored by Hani.

After eventually being knocked out of qualification, Hani had scored a total of 11 goals in 4 matches out of the 12 matches Oman had played. In one match, he was on the brink of a double hat-trick but unfortunately he couldn't. At the end of the year, he was awarded the 2001 Top Goal Scorer Award with a total of 22 international goals, beating Spain's Raúl, England's Michael Owen, and Portugal's Luís Figo, becoming the first Omani and only third Arab, to win the title.

Career statistics

Club

International goals
Scores and results list Oman's goal tally first.

Honours

Club
With Dhofar
Omani League (3): 1998–99, 2000–01, 2004–05; Runner-up 2007–08, 2009–10
Sultan Qaboos Cup (3): 1999, 1999, 2006; Runner-up 2002, 2009
Oman Super Cup (2): 1999, 2000 Runner-up 2012
Oman Professional League Cup (1): 2012–13; Runner-up 2014–15
Gulf Club Champions Cup (0): Runner-up 1996
Baniyas SC International Tournament (1): Winner 2014

With Al-Sadd
Qatar Crown Prince Cup (1): 2003
Emir of Qatar Cup (1): 2003

Individual
Oman All time top goal scorer
IFFHS World's Top Goal Scorer: 2001
Top goal scorer of the 16th Arabian Gulf Cup

Trivia
 Hani has participated in the group-draw for the 17th Arabian Gulf Cup in Qatar.
 He has featured as a match analyst on Al Jazeera Sports during the 19th Arabian Gulf Cup in Muscat a number of times, most notably in the final against Saudi Arabia national team.
 Hani Al-Dhabit has recently been called up for a Beach Soccer tournament in Dubai, in which Oman had won.

See also
 List of men's footballers with 100 or more international caps

References

External links
 
 
 
 

1979 births
Living people
People from Salalah
Omani footballers
Oman international footballers
Omani expatriate footballers
Association football midfielders
Dhofar Club players
Baniyas Club players
Al Sadd SC players
Al Jahra SC players
UAE Pro League players
Qatar Stars League players
Oman Professional League players
Expatriate footballers in the United Arab Emirates
Omani expatriate sportspeople in the United Arab Emirates
Expatriate footballers in Qatar
Omani expatriate sportspeople in Qatar
Expatriate footballers in Kuwait
Omani expatriate sportspeople in Kuwait
Footballers at the 1998 Asian Games
Footballers at the 2002 Asian Games
FIFA Century Club
Asian Games competitors for Oman
Kuwait Premier League players